Sir David Reeve Williams CBE (born 8 June 1939) is a British politician and former Leader of Richmond upon Thames Council, where he was a local government councillor for forty years. In July 2017 he was presented with the Freedom of the London Borough of Richmond upon Thames.

Early life

Williams studied at Durham University, graduating with a Bachelor of Arts degree in Politics and Economics. After university he worked as a systems analyst for IBM from 1961 until 1970.

Political career
Williams was a local government councillor for Ham, Petersham and Richmond Riverside from 1974 to 2014. He was Leader of Richmond upon Thames Council from 1983 to 2001.

Honours and awards
He was knighted in the 1999 Birthday Honours for services to local government and to the Local Government Association.

Personal life
He lives in Petersham, London with his wife Christine.

Publications

References

1939 births
Living people
Alumni of St Cuthbert's Society, Durham
Commanders of the Order of the British Empire
Councillors in the London Borough of Richmond upon Thames
IBM employees
Knights Bachelor
Leaders of local authorities of England
Liberal Democrats (UK) councillors
Petersham, London
Politicians awarded knighthoods